Nikolai Ivanovich Lobachevsky (– ) was a Russian mathematician and geometer, known primarily for his work on hyperbolic geometry, otherwise known as Lobachevskian geometry, and also for his fundamental study on  Dirichlet integrals, known as the Lobachevsky integral formula.

William Kingdon Clifford called Lobachevsky the "Copernicus of Geometry" due to the revolutionary character of his work.

Biography 
Nikolai Lobachevsky was born either in or near the city of Nizhny Novgorod in the Russian Empire (now in Nizhny Novgorod Oblast, Russia) in 1792 to parents of Russian and Polish origin – Ivan Maksimovich Lobachevsky and Praskovia Alexandrovna Lobachevskaya. He was one of three children. When he was seven, his father, a clerk in a land-surveying office, died, and Nikolai moved with his mother to Kazan. Nikolai Lobachevsky attended Kazan Gymnasium from 1802, graduating in 1807, and then received a scholarship to Kazan University, which had been founded just three years earlier in 1804.

At Kazan University, Lobachevsky was influenced by professor Johann Christian Martin Bartels, a former teacher and friend of the German mathematician Carl Friedrich Gauss (1777-1855). Lobachevsky received a Master of Science in physics and mathematics in 1811. In 1814 he became a lecturer at Kazan University, in 1816 he was promoted to associate professor. In 1822, at the age of 30, he became a full professor, teaching mathematics, physics, and astronomy. He served in many administrative positions and became the rector of Kazan University in 1827. In 1832, he married Varvara Alexeyevna Moiseyeva. They had a large number of children (eighteen according to his son's memoirs, though only seven apparently survived into adulthood). He was dismissed from the university in 1846, ostensibly due to his deteriorating health: by the early 1850s, he was nearly blind and unable to walk. He died in poverty in 1856 and was buried in Arskoe Cemetery, Kazan.

In 1811, in his student days, Lobachevsky was accused by a vengeful supervisor of atheism
().

Career
Lobachevsky's main achievement is the development (independently from János Bolyai) of a non-Euclidean geometry, also referred to as Lobachevskian geometry. Before him, mathematicians were trying to deduce Euclid's fifth postulate from other axioms. Euclid's fifth is a rule in Euclidean geometry which states (in John Playfair's reformulation) that for any given line and point not on the line, there is only one line through the point not intersecting the given line. Lobachevsky would instead develop a geometry in which the fifth postulate was not true. This idea was first reported on February 23 (Feb. 11, O.S.), 1826 to the session of the department of physics and mathematics, and this research was printed as On the Origin of Geometry (О началах геометрии) in 1829–1830 (Kazan University Course Notes). In 1829 Lobachevsky wrote a paper about his ideas called "A Concise Outline of the Foundations of Geometry" that was published by the Kazan Messenger but was rejected when it was submitted to the St. Petersburg Academy of Sciences for publication.

The non-Euclidean geometry that Lobachevsky developed is referred to as hyperbolic geometry. Lobachevsky replaced Playfair's axiom with the statement that for any given point there exists more than one line that can be extended through that point and run parallel to another line of which that point is not part. He developed the angle of parallelism which depends on the distance the point is off the given line. In hyperbolic geometry the sum of angles in a hyperbolic triangle must be less than 180 degrees.  Non-Euclidean geometry stimulated the development of differential geometry which has many applications. Hyperbolic geometry is frequently referred to as "Lobachevskian geometry" or "Bolyai–Lobachevskian geometry".

Some mathematicians and historians have wrongly claimed that Lobachevsky in his studies in non-Euclidean geometry was influenced by Gauss, which is untrue. Gauss himself appreciated Lobachevsky's published works highly, but they never had personal correspondence between them prior to the publication. Although three people—Gauss, Lobachevsky and Bolyai—can be credited with discovery of hyperbolic geometry, Gauss never published his ideas, and Lobachevsky was the first to present his views to the world mathematical community.

Lobachevsky's magnum opus Geometriya was completed in 1823, but was not published in its exact original form until 1909, long after he had died. Lobachevsky was also the author of New Foundations of Geometry (1835–1838). He also wrote Geometrical Investigations on the Theory of Parallels (1840) and Pangeometry (1855).

Another of Lobachevsky's achievements was developing a method for the approximation of the roots of algebraic equations. This method is now known as the Dandelin–Gräffe method, named after two other mathematicians who discovered it independently. In Russia, it is called the Lobachevsky method. Lobachevsky gave the definition of a function as a correspondence between two sets of real numbers (Peter Gustav Lejeune Dirichlet gave the same definition independently soon after Lobachevsky).

Impact
E. T. Bell wrote about Lobachevsky's influence on the following development of mathematics in his 1937 book Men of Mathematics:
The boldness of his challenge and its successful outcome have inspired mathematicians and scientists in general to challenge other "axioms" or accepted "truths", for example the "law" of causality which, for centuries, have seemed as necessary to straight thinking as Euclid's postulate appeared until Lobachevsky discarded it. The full impact of the Lobachevskian method of challenging axioms has probably yet to be felt. It is no exaggeration to call Lobachevsky the Copernicus of Geometry, for geometry is only a part of the vaster domain which he renovated; it might even be just to designate him as a Copernicus of all thought.

Honors
 1858 Lobachevskij, an asteroid discovered in 1972, was named in his honour.
 The lunar crater Lobachevsky was named in his honor.
 Lobachevsky Prize, a mathematics award by the Kazan State University.
 The Lobachevsky University was named in his honor.

In popular culture

 Lobachevsky is the subject of songwriter/mathematician Tom Lehrer's humorous song "Lobachevsky" from his 1953 Songs by Tom Lehrer album.  In the song, Lehrer portrays a Russian mathematician who sings about how Lobachevsky influenced him: "And who made me a big success / and brought me wealth and fame? / Nikolai Ivanovich Lobachevsky is his name."  Lobachevsky's secret to mathematical success is given as "Plagiarize!", as long as one is always careful to "call it, please, research".  According to Lehrer, the song is "not intended as a slur on [Lobachevsky's] character" and the name was chosen "solely for prosodic reasons".
 In Poul Anderson's 1969 fantasy novella "Operation Changeling" – which was later expanded into the novel Operation Chaos (1971) – a group of sorcerers navigate a non-Euclidean universe with the assistance of the ghosts of Lobachevsky and Bolyai. The story also contains the line, "Nikolai Ivanovich Lobachevsky is his name," possibly a nod to the Tom Lehrer song.
 Roger Zelazny's science fiction novel Doorways in the Sand contains a poem dedicated to Lobachevsky.
 Morris Panych's Governor General's Award-winning play, Girl in the Goldfish Bowl, references Lobachevsky repeatedly as the focus of Owen's geometry obsession.
 Vladimir Nabokov mentions Lobachevsky in his Lectures on Russian Literature.

Works
 Kagan V. F. (ed.): N. I. Lobachevsky – Complete Collected Works, Vol. I–IV (Russian), Moscow–Leningrad (GITTL), (1946–51).
 Vol. I: Geometrical Researches on the Theory of Parallels (1840); On the Origin of Geometry (1829–30).
 Vol. II: New Principles of Geometry with Complete Theory of Parallels (1835–38).
 Vol. III: Imaginary Geometry (1835); Application of imaginary geometry to certain integrals (1836); Pangeometry (1856).
 Vol. IV: Works on Other Subjects.

English translations
 Geometrical Researches on the Theory of Parallels. G. B. Halsted (tr.). 1891. Reprinted in Roberto Bonola: Non-Euclidean Geometry: A Critical and Historical Study of its Development. 1912. Dover reprint 1955.
 Also in: Seth Braver Lobachevski illuminated, MAA 2011.
 Pangeometry. Excerpts translated by Henry P. Manning: in D. E. Smith A Source Book in Mathematics. McGraw Hill 1929. Dover reprint, pp. 360–374.
 New Principles of Geometry with Complete Theory of Parallels. G. B. Halsted (tr.). 1897.
 Nikolai I. Lobachevsky, Pangeometry, translator and editor: A. Papadopoulos, Heritage of European Mathematics Series, Vol. 4, European Mathematical Society. 2010, 310 p.

See also

 1858 Lobachevskij
 Gauss–Bolyai–Lobachevsky space
 Hyperbolic geometry
 Hyperboloid structure
 Non-Euclidean geometry
 Lobachevsky (crater)
 Lobachevsky function
 Lobachevsky Medal
 Lobachevsky University
 Upper half-plane

References

External links

 
 
 Website dedicated to Lobachevsky 
 Nikolaj Ivanovič Lobačevskij - Œuvres complètes, tome 2 – Gallica-Math
 Lobachevsky State University of Nizhny Novgorod

1792 births
1856 deaths
19th-century mathematicians from the Russian Empire
Mathematicians from Kazan
Geometers
Russian atheists
Russian people of Polish descent
Burials at Arskoe Cemetery
Academic staff of Kazan Federal University